Robert, Bob or Rob Kelly may refer to:

Arts and entertainment

Music
 Robert Kelly (composer) (1916–2007), American composer of classical music
 Bob "Git It" Kelly (fl. 1950s), songwriter and member of the Rockabilly Hall of Fame
 Rob Kelly (rapper) (born 1978), Irish rapper
 R. Kelly (born 1967), American R&B singer and songwriter

Other media
 Robert Kelker-Kelly (born 1964), American soap opera actor
 Robert Kelly (comedian) (born 1970), American standup comedian
 Robert Kelly (poet) (born 1935), American poet
 Robert Kelly (comics), a fictional character in the Marvel Comics universe, named for the poet
 Percy Kelly (artist) (1918–1993), also known as Bob Kelly
 Robert Kelly (artist) (born 1956), American artist
 Bob Kelly (author) (born 1971), IT author and deployment specialist

Sports

American football
 Bob Kelly (American football, born 1925) (born 1925), American football player
 Bob Kelly (American football, born 1938) (1938–2014), American football player
 Rob Kelly (American football) (born 1974), American football player

Other sports
 Bob Kelly (baseball) (born 1927), 1950s baseball player
 Rob Kelly (cricketer) (born 1969), Australian cricketer
 Robert Kelly (cricketer) (born 1936), New Zealand cricketer
 Robert Kelly (curler), Scottish curler and coach
 Bob Kelly (footballer) (1893–1969), English footballer of the 1920s
 J. Bob Kelly (born 1946), Canadian NHL player; played for the St. Louis Blues, Pittsburgh Penguins, and Chicago Black Hawks
 Bob Kelly (ice hockey, born 1950), Canadian NHL player; played for the Philadelphia Flyers and Washington Capitals
 Rob Kelly (born 1964), English football manager and former player.
 Robert Kelly (rugby league), Irish rugby league footballer who played in the 1950s, and coached in the 1960s
 Robert Kelly (rugby union) (1907–1975), Scottish rugby union player
 Robert Kelly (Gaelic footballer), Gaelic football for Kildare
 Roberto Kelly (born 1964), Panamanian-born Major League Baseball player
 Robert Kelly (football chairman) (1902–1971), chairman of Celtic from 1947–71
 Bob Kelly (wrestler) (1936–2014), American professional wrestler and booker

Other
 Robert Kelly (political analyst) (born 1972), American political scientist
 Robert F. Kelly (born 1935), United States federal judge
 Robert J. Kelly (born 1938), United States Navy admiral who was commander in chief of the Pacific Fleet between 1991 and 1994
 Robert P. Kelly (born 1954), former CEO of the Bank of New York Mellon
 Robert Laurens Kelly (born 1957), anthropologist
 Robert Talbot Kelly (1861–1934), English orientalist landscape and genre painter
 Robert Kelly (naval officer) (1913–1989), executive officer of Motor Torpedo Boat Squadron 3 in World War II
 Robert Kelly Jr., accused in the Little Rascals day care sexual abuse trial
 Robert Kelly (politician) (1845–1920), South Australian MHA
 Robert Kelly (surgeon) (1879–1944), professor of surgery at the University of Liverpool

See also
 Bert Kelly (disambiguation)
 Robert Kelley (disambiguation)